Cyborg Commando is a science fiction role-playing game (RPG) published by New Infinities Productions, Inc in 1987 and designed by Kim Mohan and Frank Mentzer based on an outline by Gary Gygax, the creator of the original Dungeons & Dragons system.

The game is set in 2035 at a time when the earth is invaded by aliens called Xenoborgs intent on subduing humanity and taking control of the planet. Luckily humanity has developed a new kind of soldier: the Cyborg Commando, a mechanical/electronical man-like structure that can be implanted with a willing human's brain.

System
Cyborg Commando introduces a dice rolling system where players roll two ten-sided dice and multiply the numbers together. A single roll of d10xd10 is used to determine both whether an attack hits a target and how much damage it does. d10x rolls are also used with a character's skill levels to determine if the character succeeds at tasks he attempts.

Whereas a system that rolls a number of dice and adds the result produces a smooth bell curve distribution, multiplying the dice together as above produces a scattered distribution that favours lower numbers. This bottom-heavy distribution (which resembles a reversed Exponential function, exp(-x)) is used in the game to incorporate Critical hits (lucky shots that by chance hit a vulnerable spot and do an unusually large amount of damage) directly into the combined attack and damage roll.

The use of d10x as a skill roll builds diminished returns on investment and promotion into the skill/task system: only a relatively small investment of skill points is needed to purchase competency in a skill, while meaningful improvements require increasing investments. To illustrate, a skill with a percentile rank of 20 rolled with d10x gives a character a 46% base chance of success at a task, while a rank of 40 only increases the base chance to 72%, and a rank of 60 to only 81%.  If a character is granted "experience points" at a steady rate, one extra percent per point, a beginner in a skill will add many more successful new rolls for the same number of extra percents than one who has reached the expert levels.  This is in contrast to games using percentile-rolls for the skills, which often have to limit the chances to increase the skill percentages by giving these chances an inverse probability of occurring with increased skill-level.

Reception
The game received overwhelmingly negative reception. The game is today considered one of the biggest flops in the industry, partly due to the high profiles of the game's authors.

One reviewer said that "whilst Cyborg Commando isn’t the worst game written, it is outstandingly poor. This is a product that should be held up to designers as a lesson in how not to write a game".

Reviews
White Wolf #9 (1988)

Adventure scenarios
Three adventure modules for the system was released.
San Francisco Knights 1987 
Film at Eleven 1987 
Operation Bifrost 1988

Literature
Three Cyborg Commando books were published not long after the game with minor modifications of Cyborg Commando's skills and behaviour, which prompted a short explanation at the back of the books for game owners detailing why the changes were made.

Planet in Peril by Kim Mohan and Pamela O'Neill. Published in November 1987 by Ace/New Infinities, Inc. .
Chase into Space by Kim Mohan and Pamela O'Neill. Published in January 1988 by New Infinities, Inc. .
The Ultimate Prize by Kim Mohan and Pamela O'Neill. Published in March 1988 by New Infinities, Inc. .

Lynn Bryant reviewed Planet in Peril and Chase into Space in Space Gamer/Fantasy Gamer No. 83. Bryant commented that "They prove to be tightly written, well plotted, full of action, and just plain good reading. You get insight into what it is like to lose most of your body to mechanical substitutes and then have to fight a war. There is also a good sense of the outrage all the race will feel at being invaded. Even if you never look at the game, you'll enjoy the books."

References

Gary Gygax games
Science fiction role-playing games
Role-playing games introduced in 1987
Cyborgs in fiction
Military role-playing games